Jacob is a 1994 German/Italian/American television movie by Five Mile River Films, based on the novel Giacobbe by Francesco Maria Nappi, which is in turn based on a biblical account from the Book of Genesis about Jacob.

Plot 
Jacob defrauds his twin brother Esau and flees. In Haran he gets to know his cousin Rachel, and falls in love with her. Years of hard work later he marries Rachel and reconciles with his brother Esau.

Cast 
 Matthew Modine – Jacob
 Lara Flynn Boyle – Rachel
 Sean Bean – Esau
 Joss Ackland – Isaac
 Juliet Aubrey – Leah
 Irene Papas – Rebeccah
 Giancarlo Giannini – Laban
 Christoph Waltz – Morash
 Christoph M. Ohrt – Beor
 Philip Locke – Diviner
 Daniel Newman – Reuben
 Cecilia Dazzi – Bilhah
 Yvonne Sció – Judith

Production 
The movie was shot in Ouarzazate, Morocco. Director  Peter Hall's daughter, Emma, played the child Joseph.

The Crew 
 Directed by: Peter Hall
 Teleplay by: Lionel Chetwynd
 based on the novel by: Francesco Maria Nappi
 Produced by: Lorenzo Minoli and Gerald Rafshoon
 Music by: Marco Frisina and Ennio Morricone
 Director of Photography: Ennio Guarnieri
 Film Editor: Bill Blunden
 Costumes by: Enrico Sabbatini

See also
 TNT network's Bible Collection

References

External links
 

1994 films
American television films
Films based on the Book of Genesis
Films based on Italian novels
Cultural depictions of Jacob
Films set in Turkey
Films about Christianity
Bible Collection
Polygamy in fiction
Cultural depictions of Isaac
Films based on adaptations
Films shot in Morocco